Roosevelt M. Abdulgafur (born 13 July 1944) is a Filipino former swimmer. He competed in five events at the 1968 Summer Olympics.

References

External links
 

1944 births
Living people
Filipino male swimmers
Olympic swimmers of the Philippines
Swimmers at the 1968 Summer Olympics
People from Sulu
Asian Games medalists in swimming
Asian Games silver medalists for the Philippines
Asian Games bronze medalists for the Philippines
Swimmers at the 1962 Asian Games
Medalists at the 1962 Asian Games
Swimmers at the 1966 Asian Games
Medalists at the 1966 Asian Games
20th-century Filipino people
21st-century Filipino people